Acraga puno is a moth in the family Dalceridae. It was described by S.E. Miller in 1994. It is found in southern Peru. The habitat consists of tropical moist and tropical premontane wet forests.

References

Moths described in 1994
Dalceridae